Rame Peninsula was an electoral division of Cornwall in the United Kingdom which returned one member to sit on Cornwall Council from 2013 to 2021. It was abolished at the 2021 local elections, being succeeded by Rame Peninsula and St Germans.

Councillors

Extent
Rame Peninsula represented the villages of Portwrinkle, Crafthole, Wilcove, Antony, St John, Millbrook, Cremyll, Forder, Kingsand and Cawsand and the hamlets of Sheviock, Maryfield, Freathy and Rame. The division covered 3692 hectares in total.

Election results

2017 election

2013 election

References

Electoral divisions of Cornwall Council